The 1997 TranSouth Financial 400 was the fifth stock car race of the 1997 NASCAR Winston Cup Series and the 41st iteration of the event. The race was held on Sunday, March 23, 1997, in Darlington, South Carolina, at Darlington Raceway, a  permanent egg-shaped oval racetrack. The race took the scheduled 293 laps to complete. In the final laps of the race, Robert Yates Racing driver Dale Jarrett would fiercely defend his lead against Roush Racing driver Ted Musgrave to take his tenth career NASCAR Winston Cup Series victory, his second victory of the season, and his second consecutive victory. To fill out the top three, Musgrave and Hendrick Motorsports driver Jeff Gordon would finish second and third, respectively.

Background 

Darlington Raceway is a race track built for NASCAR racing located near Darlington, South Carolina. It is nicknamed "The Lady in Black" and "The Track Too Tough to Tame" by many NASCAR fans and drivers and advertised as "A NASCAR Tradition." It is of a unique, somewhat egg-shaped design, an oval with the ends of very different configurations, a condition which supposedly arose from the proximity of one end of the track to a minnow pond the owner refused to relocate. This situation makes it very challenging for the crews to set up their cars' handling in a way that is effective at both ends.

Entry list 

 (R) denotes rookie driver.

*Replaced by Phil Parsons in order for Joe Nemechek to mourn his brother John Nemechek, who had died in a racing accident.

Qualifying 
Qualifying was split into two rounds. The first round was held on Friday, March 21, at 3:00 PM EST. Each driver would have one lap to set a time. During the first round, the top 25 drivers in the round would be guaranteed a starting spot in the race. If a driver was not able to guarantee a spot in the first round, they had the option to scrub their time from the first round and try and run a faster lap time in a second round qualifying run, held on Saturday, March 22, at 11:30 AM EST. As with the first round, each driver would have one lap to set a time. Positions 26-38 would be decided on time, while positions 39-43 would be based on provisionals. Four spots are awarded by the use of provisionals based on owner's points. The fifth is awarded to a past champion who has not otherwise qualified for the race. If no past champion needs the provisional, the next team in the owner points will be awarded a provisional.

Three drivers would fail to qualify: Dick Trickle, Billy Standridge, and Steve Grissom.

Full qualifying results 

*Time not available.

Race results

References 

1997 NASCAR Winston Cup Series
NASCAR races at Darlington Raceway
March 1997 sports events in the United States
1997 in sports in South Carolina